Cassano Magnago is a town and comune in the province of Varese, Lombardy, Italy.

Notable people 

 Ivan Basso (b 1977), road cycling champion
 Umberto Bossi (b 1941), politician born here
 Lea Del Bo Rossi (1903–1978), medical researcher born here

Cities and towns in Lombardy